Alper Kulaksız (born 6 April 1992) is a Turkish athlete specialising in the long jump. He represented his country at the 2012 World Indoor Championships without qualifying for the final.

His personal bests in the long jump are 7.86 metres outdoors (+1.9 m/s, Istanbul 2016) and 7.94 metres indoors (Istanbul 2018).

International competitions

References

1992 births
Living people
Turkish male long jumpers
Competitors at the 2013 Summer Universiade
Competitors at the 2015 Summer Universiade
Competitors at the 2017 Summer Universiade
Athletes (track and field) at the 2013 Mediterranean Games
Athletes (track and field) at the 2018 Mediterranean Games
Mediterranean Games competitors for Turkey